Shine (originally titled That's Why They Call Me Shine) is a popular song with lyrics by Cecil Mack and Tin Pan Alley songwriter Lew Brown and music by Ford Dabney. It was published in 1910 by the Gotham-Attucks Music Publishing Company and used by Aida Overton Walker in His Honor the Barber, an African-American road show. According to Perry Bradford, himself a songster and publisher, the song was written about an actual man named Shine who was with George Walker when they were badly beaten during the New York City race riot of 1900.

It was later recorded by jazz and jazz influenced artists such as The California Ramblers (their version was very popular in 1924), Louis Armstrong (recorded March 9, 1931 for Okeh Records, catalog No. 41486), Ella Fitzgerald (recorded November 19, 1936 for Decca Records - catalog. No. 1062), Benny Goodman, Harry James, and Frankie Laine (1947 and 1957 - the 1947 version reached No. 9 in the Billboard charts), usually without the explanatory introduction.

Bing Crosby & The Mills Brothers recorded the song  on February 29, 1932 with Studio orchestra conducted by Victor Young.  It was issued on Brunswick Records 11376-A, a 78 rpm record and it is assessed by Joel Whitburn as reaching the No. 7 position in the charts of the day.

As a member of The Hoboken Four, Frank Sinatra sang this song in 1935 on Major Bowes Amateur Hour.

Albert Nicholas, clarinet, with The Big Chief Jazz Band recorded it in Oslo on August 29, 1955. Released on the 78 rpm record Philips P 53037 H.

Joe Brown and The Bruvvers recorded the song in 1961 and reached the British charts with a peak position of No. 33.

Anne Murray included this song on her 1976 Capitol Records album, Keeping in Touch.

Ry Cooder recorded the song complete with introduction in 1978 (see below).

Spanish vocal quartet Los Rosillo, recorded a Spanish version, with the original spoken intro, in their debut album in 1988.

Louis Armstrong version
The song was performed in a film short A Rhapsody in Black and Blue by Armstrong. The 1931 recording by Armstrong with his Sebastian New Cotton Club Orchestra is a subset of the complete lyric of the 1910 version and the expanded later version, with added scat singing and long instrumental ending:

[Instrumental opening ~35 sec.]

Oh chocolate drop, that’s me
’Cause, my hair is curly
Just because my teeth are pearly
Just because I always wear a smile
Like to dress up in the latest style
’Cause I’m glad I’m livin’
Take troubles all with a smile
Just because my color's shady
Makes no difference, baby
That’s why they call me "Shine"

[repeat words with scat and straight jazz instrumental ~2 min.]

SHINE (That's Why They Call Me Shine)
(Cecil Mack, Lew Brown)

Ry Cooder version with original introduction
On his 1978 album Jazz, Ry Cooder performed the song in a "52nd Street" small band setting, with the introductory verse that explains what the song is all about. He noted that it had been written in 1910 near the end of the "Coon song era", and described it as a unique comment on the black face sensibilities of that genre.

INTRODUCTION:
When I was born they christened me plain Samuel Johnson Brown
But I hadn't grown so very big, 'fore some folks in this town
Had changed it 'round to "Sambo"; I was "Rastus" to a few
Then "Chocolate Drop" was added by some others that I knew
And then to cap the climax, I was strolling down the line
When someone shouted, "Fellas, hey! Come on and pipe the shine!"
But I don't care a bit. Here's how I figure it:

Well, just because my hair is curly
And just because my teeth are pearly
Just because I always wear a smile
Likes to dress up in the latest style*
Just because I'm glad I'm livin' 
Take trouble smilin', never whine
Just because my color's shady
Slightly different maybe
That's why they call me shine.

ALTERNATIVE LINE:
Wear my jeans like a man of means (he always dresses in the latest style).

Also included in Ken Burns: A Jazz Collection
Documentary and three disc related collection music album

Film appearances
1931 A Rhapsody in Black and Blue - performed by Louis Armstrong and band
1941 Birth of the Blues - sung by Bing Crosby
1942 Casablanca - the song is sung by Sam (Dooley Wilson) and the band at Rick's Cafe in the movie. 
1943 Cabin in the Sky John William Sublett (aka John W. Bubbles) animates "Shine" brilliantly in a song-and-dance number in the movie.
1955 The Benny Goodman Story - performed on trumpet by Harry James.
1956 The Eddy Duchin Story - performed by Tyrone Power as Eddy Duchin and Rex Thompson as Peter Duchin with accompaniment.

References

1910 songs
Jazz songs
Songs with lyrics by Cecil Mack
Louis Armstrong songs
Frankie Laine songs
Songs with lyrics by Lew Brown
Okeh Records singles